Gun Law is a 1919 American short silent Western film directed by John Ford.

Plot summary

Cast
 Pete Morrison as Dick Allen
 Helen Gibson as Letty
 Hoot Gibson as Bart Stevens,  Smoke Gublen
 Jack Woods as Cayuse Yates
 Otto Myers as Gang Member
 Harry Chambers as Gang Member
 Ed Jones as Gang Member

See also
 Hoot Gibson filmography

References

External links
 
 

1919 films
1919 short films
1919 Western (genre) films
American silent short films
American black-and-white films
Films directed by John Ford
Silent American Western (genre) films
1910s American films
1910s English-language films